Dysaules uvana is a species of praying mantis in the genus Dysaules.

See also
List of mantis genera and species

References

Tarachodidae
Insects described in 1932